The Pirate Party (Croatian: Piratska Stranka), short - Pirates (Croatian: Pirati) was a political party in Croatia founded in March 2012 and the Croatian section of the Pirate Parties International movement.  It follows the example of the Swedish Pirate Party as a party of the information society and it fights for freedom of information and the protection of privacy. The party was removed from the state registry of political parties by 2018.

Electoral results

European Parliament

References

Croatia
Liberal parties in Croatia